"Candidatus Bartonella monaxi" is a candidatus bacteria from the genus of Bartonella which was isolated from groundhogs (Marmota monax)

References

Bartonellaceae
Candidatus taxa
Groundhogs